Mike Perry (born 1969) was creative director at Maxis and Electronic Arts, where he worked on many of the Sim games. He produced and designed the award-winning title SimFarm, and both produced and programmed Yoot Saito's award-winning title SimTower. As of 2011, he is an executive producer at Zynga, managing the FarmVille game.

Biography
Perry's first game was an Astrosmash clone, which he wrote in BASIC on a Timex Sinclair 1000 at the age of 13. He lived at Pensacola Naval Air Station, as his stepfather was an officer in the U.S. Navy. Perry was a C64 enthusiast in high school, using it to teach himself how to program games and BBS applications. His stepfather later took a job as medical professor at the University of South Alabama, which school Perry attended as well, studying music. However, he dropped out before graduating, to explore a musical career and move to California.

For the next two years he worked part-time at the videogame booth in a Toys R Us store, and played rhythm guitar for a local heavy metal band. He then decided to seek an actual career in the game industry, cold-calling various companies in the Bay Area, and finally obtaining a job as a "Game Counselor" (telephone support) at Hudson Soft. Over the next two years his duties expanded within the company, including work on such games as Bomberman 2 and Super Adventure Island.

In 1992, Perry was hired by Jeff Braun of Maxis to work as a project manager, doing what was called "Maintenance Producing," supporting updates on existing products such as SimEarth and SimCity. Perry was then given a new project, SimFarm, which he produced and co-designed with engineer Eric Albers. The game won the Codie award in 1993 from the Software Publishers Association as "Best Secondary Education Program."  The following year, Perry produced Yoot Saito's SimTower, which won the CODiE for Best Simulation Program. He was one of the employees who stayed with the company when it was acquired by Electronic Arts in 1997.

He has given talks at the Game Developers Conference, and in 2003, published a series of "Designer Diaries", documenting the development of the console version of The Sims.

In 2011, Perry left Maxis/EA, and as of July 2011 is working at Zynga, where he is executive producer of FarmVille.

Works

Maxis
 SimFarm (1993), producer and designer
 SimTower (1994), producer
 SimHealth (1994), producer
 Klik & Play (1994), producer with Europress Ltd
 SimCity Classic (1995), producer and programmer
 SimCity 2000 Network Edition (1996), producer and designer
 SimCopter (1996), programmer
 Streets of SimCity (1997), designer

Electronic Arts
 The Sims (2000), designer
 SimCity 3000 Unlimited (2000), programmer
 The Sims Online (2002), programmer
 The Sims: Bustin' Out (2003), designer
 SimCity 4: Rush Hour (2003), tester
 The Urbz: Sims in the City (2004), designer
 The Godfather: The Game (2006), creative director
 The Godfather II (2009), creative director
 Darkspore (2011), executive producer

Zynga
 FarmVille (2011), executive producer

References

External links
 Personal website
 GDC bio

1969 births
American video game designers
American video game producers
American video game programmers
Electronic Arts employees
Place of birth missing (living people)
Living people
Maxis
People from California